Jaquez is a surname. Notable people with the name include:

Anna Jaquez (born 1953), American artist and art professor
César Duarte Jáquez (born 1963), Mexican politician
Jaime Jaquez Jr. (born 2001), American basketball player
Pablo Jáquez (born 1995), Mexican footballer
Sonya Jaquez Lewis, American politician

See also

Jaques, given name and surname